Nine Muses A (Hangul: 나인뮤지스A, stylized as 9MUSES A or 9MUSES AMUSE) was the first sub-group of South Korean girl group Nine Muses formed by Star Empire Entertainment in 2016. It was composed of four Nine Muses members: Gyeongree, Hyemi, Sojin and Keumjo. The group released their debut single album Muses Diary on August 4, 2016.

History

2016: Debut with Muses Diary 
After the departure of members Minha and Euaerin from Nine Muses in June 2016, Star Empire announced that the group would be making a summer comeback with a unit promotion with no further details. In early July, it was officially announced that the sub-unit would consist of four members, revealing member Gyeongree as the first official member of the sub-unit. The sub-unit debuted in early August. 
 On July 21, it was revealed that the full line-up for the sub-group consisted of members Gyeongree (Center), Hyemi (Leader), Sojin (Rapper) and Keumjo (Main Vocal), also revealing that the song "Lip 2 Lip" would be their debut song. Nine Muses A is a shortened name for Nine Muses Amuse, meaning that the group will always make others happy and let them have a great time with their performance.

Nine Muses A released their debut single album Muses Diary on August 4, 2016.

Discography

Single albums

Singles

Tours
 Star Empire Family Concert (2016)

References 

K-pop music groups
Musical groups established in 2016
South Korean girl groups
2016 establishments in South Korea
Vocal quartets